Estonia participated in the 2010 Summer Youth Olympics in Singapore.

Competitors
The following is the list of number of competitors that participated at the Games per sport.

Athletics

Boys
Field Events

Girls
Field Events

Judo

Individual

Team

Rowing

Sailing

Windsurfing

Swimming

References

2010 in Estonian sport
Nations at the 2010 Summer Youth Olympics
2010 Summer Youth Olympics